Blue Bank is an unincorporated community in eastern Lake County, Tennessee.

Blue Bank is on the southern shores of Reelfoot Lake. The community is also the location of Reelfoot Lake State Park.

References

Unincorporated communities in Tennessee
Unincorporated communities in Lake County, Tennessee